Christian Stratton Couch (born May 1, 1973) is an American professional golfer who currently plays on the PGA Tour.

Couch was born in Fort Lauderdale, Florida.  He accepted an athletic scholarship to attend the University of Florida in Gainesville, Florida, where he played for coach Buddy Alexander's Florida Gators men's golf team in National Collegiate Athletic Association (NCAA) competition from 1992 to 1995.  As a sophomore, he was a member of the Gators' 1993 NCAA championship team that also included future PGA Tour golfer Brian Gay.  During his time as a Gator golfer, the team also won Southeastern Conference (SEC) championships in 1992, 1993 and 1994.  Couch was recognized as the SEC Freshman of the Year in 1992, a second-team All-SEC selection in 1993 and 1994, and a first-team All-SEC selection in 1995.  In 1993 and 1995, he received All-American honors.

Couch turned professional in 1995.  It took him a long time to get established and his first couple of spells on the PGA Tour ended when he failed to win enough money to retain his tour card. He won five times on the Nationwide Tour between 2001 and 2005, and in 2006 he made a breakthrough by winning the PGA Tour's Zurich Classic of New Orleans. He won with a 55-foot chip-in (using a cross-handed grip) after a poor shot out of a difficult lie in a bunker.

A poor 2007 season saw Couch finish 167th on the money list and he did not play in 2008 due to a shoulder injury. He played on the PGA Tour in 2009 and 2010 on a major medical extension. By August 2010, Couch earned enough to satisfy his medical exemption and keep his tour card.

Couch went six years without playing a PGA Tour event due to a back injury before making the cut at the 2018 Valspar Championship with a T68.

Professional wins (6)

PGA Tour wins (1)

Nationwide Tour wins (5)

Nationwide Tour playoff record (1–0)

Results in major championships

CUT = missed the half-way cut
Note: Couch only played in the PGA Championship.

Results in The Players Championship

CUT = missed the halfway cut
"T" indicates a tie for a place

Results in World Golf Championships

"T" = Tied

See also

1998 PGA Tour Qualifying School graduates
2003 Nationwide Tour graduates
2005 Nationwide Tour graduates
List of Florida Gators men's golfers on the PGA Tour
List of golfers with most Web.com Tour wins

References

External links

American male golfers
Florida Gators men's golfers
PGA Tour golfers
Korn Ferry Tour graduates
Golfers from Florida
Sportspeople from Fort Lauderdale, Florida
Sportspeople from Gainesville, Florida
People from Winter Garden, Florida
1973 births
Living people